RCX may refer to:

RCX register, a 64-bit processor register of x86 CPUs
Rally Championship Xtreme
 Retrocommissioning (RCx), see 
 A Lego Mindstorms controller device
 The circumflex branch of left the coronary artery